Chung Chuck, born Chung Mor Ping in 1897 in Canton Province, China, emigrated in 1909 to Ladner, British Columbia, Canada. He died on December 8, 1986.

Personal life
He married Mary (May Lee, 1907–1969) in 1940. They had six children: two sons and four daughters.

Chung Chuck was a potato farmer who fought for the rights of ethnic groups, including Chinese settlers in Canada who were subject to discrimination, including a head tax and other discriminatory policies. He was known as the "Delta Rifleman" for breaking an illegal blockade that targeted and stopped Chinese farmers from selling their produce.

References

Additional sources
http://www.canada.com/story_print.html?id=22269303-9a80-4d7d-b146-3dc5c0b9ea42&sponsor
http://www.vancouverhistory.ca/chronology1986.htm 
http://www.narrativethreads.ca/explorer-explore/panier_demigres_chinois-chinese_settlement_basket.html

1897 births
1986 deaths
Canadian farmers
Chinese emigrants to Canada